The Affair of the Poisons (French: L'affaire des poisons, Italian: Il processo dei veleni) is a 1955 French-Italian historical drama film directed by Henri Decoin and starring Danielle Darrieux, Viviane Romance and Paul Meurisse. The film is adapted from the 1907 play of the same title by Victorien Sardou. It was shot in Technicolor at the Boulogne Studios in Paris. The film's sets were designed by the art director Jean d'Eaubonne. The film is set against the backdrop of the real Affair of the Poisons in seventeenth century France, and demonstrates a darker tone than many more nostalgic depictions of the past.

Synopsis
Worried that she is losing the interest of Louis XIV, his lover Madame de Montespan turns to a young witch who takes part in network of black magic and poisoning. The ensuing scandal rocks the French court and leads to arrests, executions and the banishment of de Montespan from public life.

Cast
 Danielle Darrieux as Françoise Athénaïs de Montespan
 Viviane Romance as Catherine Deshayes dite La Voisin
 Paul Meurisse as L'abbé Etienne Guibourg
 Anne Vernon as 	Hermine Des Oeillets
 Pierre Mondy as Le capitaine François Desgrez
 François Patrice as Monsieur de Lignières
 Christine Carère as Marie-Angélique de Fontanges 
 Roldano Lupi as 	L'alchimiste Lesage
 Albert Rémy as 	Le bourreau Guillaume
 Luisa Rossi as 	Madame Gobet
 Renaud Mary as 	Henri de Montespan
 Maurice Teynac as Nicolas de la Reynie
 Roland Armontel as 	L'aveugle 
 Michel Etcheverry as Le prédicateur
 Albert Michel as 	Gobet
 Jacques Moulières as 	L'enfant de l'aveugle 
 André Numès Fils as 	Le greffier 
 Dominique Page as 	La fille enceinte
 Simone Paris as 	Madame de Ludre
 Jean-Marie Robain as 	Un juge de la Chambre Ardente

References

Bibliography
 Oscherwitz, Danya. Past Forward: French Cinema and the Post-Colonial Heritage. SIU Press, 2010.

External links

1955 films
1950s historical drama films
French historical drama films
Italian historical drama films
1950s French-language films
Films shot at Boulogne Studios
Films directed by Henri Decoin
Films set in the 17th century
Gaumont Film Company films
French films based on plays
Films based on works by Victorien Sardou
1950s French films
1950s Italian films